Eindhoven Centraal railway station is the main railway station in Eindhoven in North Brabant, Netherlands. It is the busiest station outside the Randstad area and an important station in the southern part of The Netherlands.

History

The station was opened on 1 July 1866 and is located on the Breda–Eindhoven railway, the Venlo–Eindhoven railway and the Eindhoven–Weert railway. The station is operated by Nederlandse Spoorwegen.

The station is 900m east of the Philips Stadion, which is served by Eindhoven Stadion railway station in the event of football matches or other special events at the stadium.

Train services
Eindhoven Centraal is a major interchange station for train services in the southern Netherlands. The station is served by the following service(s):

2x per hour Intercity services (Schagen -) Alkmaar - Amsterdam - Utrecht - Eindhoven - Sittard - Maastricht
2x per hour Intercity services The Hague - Breda - Eindhoven
2x per hour Intercity services Schiphol - Utrecht - Eindhoven - Venlo
2x per hour Intercity services Enkhuizen - Amsterdam - Utrecht - Eindhoven - Heerlen
1x per hour night train (nachtnet) service Rotterdam - Breda - Eindhoven (weekends only)
1x per hour night train (nachtnet) service Utrecht - 's-Hertogenbosch - Eindhoven (weekends only)
2x per hour local services (sprinter) Tilburg Universiteit - Eindhoven
2x per hour local services (sprinter) 's-Hertogenbosch - Eindhoven - Deurne
2x per hour local services (sprinter) Eindhoven - Weert

Bus services
Eindhoven Centraal railway station is served by bus station Neckerspoel, on the north side, with the following city bus lines (there are also 30 regional bus lines):

Stadsbussen

Gallery

External links

NS website
Dutch Public Transport journey planner

Railway stations in Eindhoven
Railway stations opened in 1866
Railway stations on the Staatslijn E
1866 establishments in the Netherlands
Railway stations in the Netherlands opened in the 19th century